Estanavand Naruheh castle (also Ostanavand, Ustanawand or Ustunawand) is a historical castle located in Garmsar County in Semnan Province, The longevity of this fortress dates back to the Nizari Ismaili state.

References 

Castles in Iran
Castles of the Nizari Ismaili state